Stackendorf is a small village located in Bavaria, Germany. It is in Upper Franconia, in the Bamberg district. Stackendorf is a constituent community of Buttenheim. In 2007, it had a population of 270.

Geography
A stream called the Deichselbach flows through the village.

The village has an elevation of about 400 meters.

Stackendorf lies in the nature park "Naturpark Fränkische Schweiz - Veldensteiner Forst."

Culture
There are several community organizations in Tiefenhöchstadt:
 Horticulture Club: "Gartenbauverein Stackendorf" 
 Volunteer Fire Department: "FFW-Stackendorf"

References

External links

 Google Maps - Stackendorf, Accessed September 20, 2010.
 Naturpark Fränkische Schweiz - Veldensteiner Forst, Accessed August 27, 2010. 

Villages in Bavaria
Bamberg (district)